Fort Reno may refer to any of the three United States Army posts named for General Jesse L. Reno:

Fort Reno Park, in Washington, D.C., established 1862 (originally Fort Pennsylvania)
Fort Reno (Oklahoma), in present-day Oklahoma, established during the Indian Wars, July 1874
Fort Reno (Wyoming), in present-day Wyoming on the Bozeman Trail, established August 1865

See also
 Reno (disambiguation)